Henipavirus is a genus of negative-strand RNA viruses in the family Paramyxoviridae, order Mononegavirales containing six established species, and numerous others still under study. Henipaviruses are naturally harboured by several species of small mammals, notably pteropid fruit bats (flying foxes), microbats of several species, and shrews. Henipaviruses are characterised by long genomes and a wide host range. Their recent emergence as zoonotic pathogens capable of causing illness and death in domestic animals and humans is a cause of concern.

In 2009, RNA sequences of three novel viruses in phylogenetic relationship to known henipaviruses were detected in African straw-colored fruit bats (Eidolon helvum) in Ghana. The finding of these novel henipaviruses outside Australia and Asia indicates that the region of potential endemicity of henipaviruses may be worldwide. These African henipaviruses are slowly being characterised.

Nipah and Hendra henipaviruses are both considered category C (USDA-HHS overlap) select agents.

Structure

Henipavirions are pleomorphic (variably shaped), ranging in size from 40 to 600 nm in diameter. They possess a lipid membrane overlying a shell of viral matrix protein. At the core is a single helical strand of genomic RNA tightly bound to N (nucleocapsid) protein and associated with the L (large) and P (phosphoprotein) proteins, which provide RNA polymerase activity during replication.

Embedded within the lipid membrane are spikes of F (fusion) protein trimers and G (attachment) protein tetramers. The function of the G protein (except in the case of MojV-G) is to attach the virus to the surface of a host cell via Ephrin B1, B2, or B3, a family of highly conserved mammalian proteins. The structure of the attachment glycoprotein has been determined by X-ray crystallography. The F protein fuses the viral membrane with the host cell membrane, releasing the virion contents into the cell. It also causes infected cells to fuse with neighbouring cells to form large, multinucleated syncytia.

Genome

As all mononegaviral genomes, Hendra virus and Nipah virus genomes are non-segmented, single-stranded negative-sense RNA. Both genomes are 18.2 kb in length and contain six genes corresponding to six structural proteins.

In common with other members of the Paramyxoviridae family, the number of nucleotides in the henipavirus genome is a multiple of six, consistent with what is known as the 'rule of six'. Deviation from the rule of six, through mutation or incomplete genome synthesis, leads to inefficient viral replication, probably due to structural constraints imposed by the binding between the RNA and the N protein.

Henipaviruses employ an unusual process called RNA editing to generate multiple proteins from a single gene. The specific process in henipaviruses involves the insertion of extra guanosine residues into the P gene mRNA prior to translation. The number of residues added determines whether the P, V C, or W proteins are synthesised. The functions of the V and W proteins are unknown, but they may be involved in disrupting host antiviral mechanisms.

Life Cycle 
Cell receptor ephrin-B2, which is located on epithelial cells around smaller arteries, neurons, and smooth muscle cells,  is targeted by the viral protein G. Once the protein G binds to ephrin-B2, the viral protein F facilitates fusion with the host cell membrane and releases viral RNA into the host cell cytoplasm. Upon entry, transcription of viral mRNA takes place using the viral RNA as a template. This process is started and stopped by the polymerase complex. Viral proteins are gathering in the cell as transcription occurs until the polymerase complex stops transcription and starts genome replication. Transcription of the viral RNA makes positive sense strands of RNA, which are then used as templates to make more negative sense viral RNA . Genome replication is halted before the viral particles can assemble to make a virion. Once the cell membrane is ready, new virions exit the host cell through budding.

Vaccine 
Henipaviruses have high mortality rates in mammalian hosts, both human and animal. Because of this, there is a need for immunization against HeV and NiV. Both diseases can be transmitted from animals to humans and can cause respiratory and neurological issues. HeV and NiV appear as encephalitis or severe respiratory illnesses in human hosts. Animal hosts also experience respiratory distress and occasionally fever and neurological disease. Other vaccines for viruses in the Paramyxoviridae family use neutralizing antibodies directed to bind to the surface glycoproteins. A vaccine for henipaviruses has still not been made, but would probably follow the same model as other vaccines for Paramyxoviridae family viruses.

Causes of emergence
The emergence of henipaviruses parallels the emergence of other zoonotic viruses in recent decades. SARS coronavirus, Australian bat lyssavirus, Menangle virus, Marburg virus and possibly Ebola viruses are also harboured by bats, and are capable of infecting a variety of other species. The emergence of each of these viruses has been linked to an increase in contact between bats and humans, sometimes involving an intermediate domestic animal host. The increased contact is driven both by human encroachment into the bats' territory (in the case of Nipah, specifically pigpens in said territory) and by movement of bats towards human populations due to changes in food distribution and loss of habitat.

There is evidence that habitat loss for flying foxes, both in South Asia and Australia (particularly along the east coast) as well as encroachment of human dwellings and agriculture into the remaining habitats, is creating greater overlap of human and flying fox distributions.

Taxonomy

See also

 Animal viruses
 Paramyxovirus

References

External links

 ICTV Report: Paramyxoviridae
 Disease card
 ViralZone: Henipavirus
 Henipavirus – Henipavirus Ecology Research Group (HERG) INFO
 Virus Pathogen Database and Analysis Resource (ViPR): Paramyxoviridae

Animal virology
Paramyxoviridae
Virus genera